Mar Odisho Oraham, born 1961, is the Assyrian Church of the East Bishop of Scandinavia and Germany with residence in Sweden.

References

Odisho Oraham
1961 births
Living people
Swedish bishops